is a former Japanese ice hockey player for Mitsuboshi Daito Peregrine (now Douro Kensetsu-Peregrine) and the Japanese national team. She participated in the 2015 IIHF Women's World Championship.

References

1995 births
Living people
Japanese women's ice hockey defencemen